The Amazing Spiez! is an animated television series produced by the French company Marathon Media and the Canadian company Image Entertainment Corporation. It is a spinoff of Totally Spies!. The series premiered on 15 March 2009, and debuted on one of its original channels, TF1, on 1 April 2009. Its final episode was broadcast on 25 May 2012.

Series overview

Episodes

Season 1 (2009–2010) 
The main characters in the show are Lee, Marc, Megan, Tony, Cal, Karen, Tami and Jerry.

Season 2 (2010–2012) 
The main characters are Lee, Marc, Megan, Tony, Tami and Jerry. The landing crash pad chair gets replaced by a pink bean bag chair.

References

External links 

Lists of Canadian children's animated television series episodes